Wexford Wanderers RFC is an Irish rugby team based in Wexford, County Wexford, playing in Division 2A of the Leinster League. The club colours are blue, white and black. In addition to the First XV and Second XV there are also youth sides from U7 to U18 as well as a women's team, and U12, U14, U16 and U18 Girls teams.

Former Leinster and Ireland centre Gordon D'Arcy played youth rugby at the club. And recently U20 Irish caps for Jack Stafford Brian Deeny and Greg McGrath. Katie Fitzhenry has been capped in the Irish 15s and 7s teams.

History
Although the club was only officially founded in 1924, there had been a Wanderers team prior to this.

Honours
 Leinster Towns Cup|Provincial Towns Cup: 1930
McAuley cup [under 15] 1985 2016
Leinster Cup [under 12 ]2009
 Popplewell Cup[under 12]2009; 2010
 Leinster premier league champions [under 13] 2011
 Leinster Cup [under13] 2011
 Leinster premier league cup [under 15] 2011
 Pat Lawlor Invitational [all ireland][under13] 2011

References
 Wexford Wanderers RFC

Irish rugby union teams
Rugby clubs established in 1924
Rugby union clubs in County Wexford